Group B of UEFA Euro 2004 was one of four groups in the final tournament's initial group stage. It began on 13 June and was completed on 21 June. The group consisted of defending champions France, England, Croatia and Switzerland.

France won the group and advanced to the quarter-finals, along with England. Croatia and Switzerland failed to advance.

Teams

Notes

Standings

In the quarter-finals,
The winner of Group B, France, advanced to play the runner-up of Group A, Greece.
The runner-up of Group B, England, advanced to play the winner of Group A, Portugal.

Matches

Switzerland vs Croatia

France vs England

England vs Switzerland

Croatia vs France

Croatia vs England

Switzerland vs France

References

External links
UEFA Euro 2004 Group B

Group B
Group
Group
Switzerland at UEFA Euro 2004
Croatia at UEFA Euro 2004